Divine Mercy Church in Prudnik, Poland, is a brick church, part of the Roman Catholic Diocese of Opole. It's located in the eastern part of town, in the Jasionowe Wzgórze residential area, at the 35 Aleksandra Skowrońskiego Street.

History 
The construction of the new catechetical house and monastery of the Dominican Order began on 4 September 1989. On 23 September 1989, Bishop Jan Wieczorek consecrated the cross and the place for construction. Before Christmas, a chapel was set up. On 20 October 1996, the foundation stone was solemnly laid by Bishop Alfons Nossol.

See also 
 Saints Peter and Paul Church, Prudnik
 St. Michael's Church, Prudnik
 St. Joseph Church, Prudnik

References

External links 
 Parafia Miłosierdzia Bożego w Prudniku

Buildings and structures in Prudnik
Prudnik
20th-century Roman Catholic church buildings in Poland